Andresito is a village in the north of Flores Department of Uruguay.

Geography
It is located on Km. 238 of Route 3 and close to its junctions with Route 14.

Both rivers discharge into Lake Paso del Palmar at this point.

Population
In 2011 Andresito had a population of 261.
 
Source: Instituto Nacional de Estadística de Uruguay

See also 
 Geography of Uruguay

References

External links
INE map of Andresito

Populated places in the Flores Department